Mark Raymond Gillespie (born 17 October 1979) is a former New Zealand cricketer. He came to the selectors attention in the 2005–06 season with 43 wickets at 23.16 for Wellington. He then played for New Zealand A in the Top-End series of 2006 before being included in New Zealand's squad of 14 for the Champions Trophy.

International career
Gillespie has taken Twenty20 Internationals with 4/7  during New Zealand's 9 wicket win over Kenya in the 2007 ICC World Twenty20.

On his Test Match debut, he took five wickets in the first innings against South Africa at Centurion in 2007.

References

External links

 

1979 births
Living people
Wellington cricketers
New Zealand Test cricketers
New Zealand One Day International cricketers
New Zealand Twenty20 International cricketers
New Zealand cricketers
Cricketers at the 2007 Cricket World Cup
Cricketers who have taken five wickets on Test debut
People educated at Tawa College

mr:मार्क गिलेस्पी